Trikkur  is a village in Thrissur district in the state of Kerala, India. It is situated on the eastern bank of Manali river.

Demographics
 India census, Trikkur had a population of 10,572 with 5,221 males and 5,351 females.

Trikkur Mahadeva Temple

Trikkur Mahadeva Temple, a protected monument under the Department of Archaeology, Govt of Kerala, is located in this village.
Similarly, Mathikkunnu Bhagavathi Temple located at Mathikkunnu is also a popular temple in Trikkur.

Noted residents

Swami Ranganathananda, president of the Ramakrishna Mission
Shri M.D Dinesh Nair, poet
Shri Anoop Sankar, Playback Singer

References

Villages in Thrissur district